Caulerpa heterophylla is a species of seaweed in the Caulerpaceae family.

The seaweed is found in two places along the coast one from around Perth and the other near Albany in Western Australia.

References

heterophylla
Species described in 1998